The 1990 Cal State Northridge  Matadors football team represented California State University, Northridge as a member of the Western Football Conference (WFC) during the 1990 NCAA Division II football season. Led by fifth-year head coach Bob Burt, Cal State Northridge compiled an overall record of 7–4 with a mark of 4–1 in conference play, sharing the WFC title Cal Poly. The Matadors advanced to the NCAA Division II Football Championship playoffs for the first time in program history, losing in the first round to Cal Poly in a rematch of the WFC co-champions. The team was outscored by its opponents 179 to 173 for the season. The Matadors played home games at North Campus Stadium in Northridge, California.

Schedule

Team players in the NFL
No Cal State Northridge players were selected in the 1991 NFL Draft.

The following finished their college career in 1990 were not drafted, but played in the NFL.

References

Cal State Northridge
Cal State Northridge Matadors football seasons
Western Football Conference champion seasons
Cal State Northridge Matadors football